Swedish School Beijing (SSB;) was a Swedish international school in Gahood Villa (嘉浩别墅), Shunyi District, Beijing.  Maria Hedelin-Björse was its headmistress. The school served students aged 2–12 and followed the Swedish curriculum, but was staffed by Chinese employees. Students from all Scandinavian countries were eligible to attend.

History
The school was established in 1994.

On the 3rd of March 2015,  the school council decided that the school must be closed due to declining enrollment, and it notified parents on the 4th of March. The school's final semester ended on the 6th of June 2015, on Sweden's National Day, and the school closed on the 30th of June.

See also
 Swedish School in Moscow
 China–Sweden relations

References

External links
 Swedish School Beijing 

International schools in Beijing
2015 disestablishments in China
Educational institutions disestablished in 2015
Swedish international schools
1994 establishments in China
Educational institutions established in 1994
China–Sweden relations
Schools in Shunyi District